Kingwood Township is a township in Hunterdon County, in the U.S. state of New Jersey, located on the Hunterdon Plateau. As of the 2020 United States census, the township's population was 3,802, a decrease of 43 (−1.1%) from the 2010 census count of 3,845, which in turn reflected an increase of 63 (+1.7%) from the 3,782 counted in the 2000 census.

History

Kingwood Township is one of the westernmost townships of Hunterdon County. Kingwood was originally established around 1746 when it was created from Bethlehem Township, though the exact details are uncertain. Kingwood was incorporated  by Act of the New Jersey Legislature on February 21, 1798, as one of New Jersey's initial group of 104 townships. Portions of the township were taken to form Franklin Township on April 7, 1845. Frenchtown borough acquired portions of the township in 1876.

Kingwood Township was the home of Daniel Bray, the local captain who rounded up the boats for George Washington's crossing of the Delaware River during the Revolutionary War. The portion of Route 29 that runs through the township along its western edge is named for him.

In late 1981, Dick Siano became the first Libertarian Party candidate to win a partisan election outside of Alaska by winning a committee seat in the township. In the November election, he and the Democratic tied in the general election placing the incumbent Republican mayor in third place. Siano won the runoff election held on December 22.

Geography
According to the United States Census Bureau, the township had a total area of 35.62 square miles (92.24 km2), including 35.01 square miles (90.66 km2) of land and 0.61 square miles (1.58 km2) of water (1.71%).

The township borders the municipalities of Alexandria Township, Delaware Township, Franklin Township and Frenchtown in Hunterdon County; and the communities of Plumstead Township and Tinicum Township in Bucks County, across the Delaware River in Pennsylvania. Exposed rock can be seen on portions of Route 29 in the township between the River and the plateau.

Unincorporated communities, localities and place names located partially or completely within the township include Baptistown, Barbertown, Byram, Idell, Milltown, Point Breeze, Treasure Island, Tumble and Tumble Falls.

Frenchtown Solar is a group of three photovoltaic arrays owned by Consolidated Edison that forms one of the largest solar farms in the state, covering  with a total of 68,500 solar panels and a 20.1 megawatt generating capacity. Two arrays are located just outside Baptistown on Route 12. The third and largest is to the south off County Route 519.<ref>Rojas, Cristina. "Kingwood gives preliminary OK to solar field on Route 519", Hunterdon County Democrat', October 19, 2011. Accessed April 21, 2015.</ref>

Demographics

2010 census

The Census Bureau's 2006–2010 American Community Survey showed that (in 2010 inflation-adjusted dollars) median household income was $94,951 (with a margin of error of +/− $8,656) and the median family income was $101,722 (+/− $3,508). Males had a median income of $62,636 (+/− $11,644) versus $39,704 (+/− $5,890) for females. The per capita income for the borough was $38,977 (+/− $4,174). About 2.7% of families and 3.2% of the population were below the poverty line, including 6.1% of those under age 18 and none of those age 65 or over.

2000 census
As of the 2000 United States census there were 3,782 people, 1,340 households, and 1,042 families residing in the township.  The population density was 107.4 people per square mile (41.4/km2).  There were 1,422 housing units at an average density of 40.4 per square mile (15.6/km2).  The racial makeup of the township was 97.62% White, 0.61% African American, 0.08% Native American, 0.77% Asian, 0.19% from other races, and 0.74% from two or more races. Hispanic or Latino of any race were 1.85% of the population.DP-1: Profile of General Demographic Characteristics: 2000 - Census 2000 Summary File 1 (SF 1) 100-Percent Data for Kingwood township, Hunterdon County, New Jersey , United States Census Bureau. Accessed November 14, 2012.

There were 1,340 households, out of which 38.9% had children under the age of 18 living with them, 68.9% were married couples living together, 6.0% had a female householder with no husband present, and 22.2% were non-families. 17.6% of all households were made up of individuals, and 6.9% had someone living alone who was 65 years of age or older.  The average household size was 2.82 and the average family size was 3.21.

In the township the population was spread out, with 27.3% under the age of 18, 4.8% from 18 to 24, 31.6% from 25 to 44, 25.7% from 45 to 64, and 10.5% who were 65 years of age or older.  The median age was 39 years. For every 100 females, there were 102.0 males. For every 100 females age 18 and over, there were 99.3 males.

The median income for a household in the township was $71,551, and the median income for a family was $81,642. Males had a median income of $54,107 versus $31,326 for females. The per capita income for the township was $30,219.  About 2.3% of families and 2.9% of the population were below the poverty line, including 4.1% of those under age 18 and none of those age 65 or over.

 Government 

Local government
Kingwood Township operates under the Township form of New Jersey municipal government, one of 141 municipalities (of the 564) statewide that use this form. The Township Committee is comprised of three members, who are elected directly by the voters at-large in partisan elections to serve three-year terms of office on a staggered basis, with one seat coming up for election each year as part of the November general election in a three-year cycle."Forms of Municipal Government in New Jersey", p. 7. Rutgers University Center for Government Studies. Accessed June 3, 2015. The Mayor is elected by the Committee from among its members and serves a one-year term, as does the Deputy Mayor. The Mayor serves as the Chairperson of the Committee and votes as an equal member, but has no other special powers.History of the Township Form of Government, Kingwood Township. Accessed May 5, 2020. "Under the current township government laws as they apply to Kingwood Township, three Committee members are elected at-large in partisan elections to serve staggered three-year terms. The Mayor is elected by the Committee and serves a one-year term, as does the Deputy Mayor. The Mayor serves as the Chairperson of the Committee and votes as an equal member, but has no other special powers under our adoption of the township form of government."

, members of the Kingwood Township Committee are Mayor Maureen Syrnick (R, term on committee ends December 31, 2023; term as mayor ends 2022), Deputy Mayor Thomas Ciacciarelli (R, term on committee and as deputy mayor ends 2022) and Andrew Russano Jr. (R, 2024).2022 Municipal User Friendly Budget, Kingwood Township. Accessed August 14, 2022.2022 County and Municipal Directory, Hunterdon County, New Jersey. Accessed August 1, 2022.November 3, 2020 District Report Hunterdon County Official Results, Hunterdon County, New Jersey, updated November 20, 2020. Accessed January 1, 2021.

 Federal, state and county representation 
Kingwood Township is located in the 7th Congressional District and is part of New Jersey's 23rd state legislative district.2019 New Jersey Citizen's Guide to Government, New Jersey League of Women Voters. Accessed October 30, 2019.

 

Politics
In the 2012 presidential election, Republican Mitt Romney received 62.5% of the vote (1,282 cast), ahead of Democrat Barack Obama with 36.1% (741 votes), and other candidates with 1.3% (27 votes), among the 2,066 ballots cast by the township's 2,797 registered voters (16 ballots were spoiled), for a turnout of 73.9%.

In the 2013 gubernatorial election, Republican Chris Christie received 77.9% of the vote (1,006 cast), ahead of Democrat Barbara Buono with 19.3% (250 votes), and other candidates with 2.8% (36 votes), among the 1,313 ballots cast by the township's 2,751 registered voters (21 ballots were spoiled), for a turnout of 47.7%.

 Education 
The Kingwood Township School District serves public school students ranging from pre-kindergarten through eighth grade at Kingwood Township School.2019-2020 Public School Directory, Hunterdon County Department of Education. Accessed November 17, 2019. As of the 2018–19 school year, the district, comprised of one school, had an enrollment of 328 students and 33.2 classroom teachers (on an FTE basis), for a student–teacher ratio of 9.9:1.

Students in public school for ninth through twelfth grades attend Delaware Valley Regional High School, together with students from Alexandria Township, Frenchtown, Holland Township and Milford borough.Delaware Valley Regional School District 2016 Report Card Narrative, New Jersey Department of Education. Accessed May 5, 2020. "The Delaware Valley Regional High School District can be found in the heart of pastoral and beautiful Hunterdon County, New Jersey. The District serves students in grades nine through twelve who reside in the five municipalities that comprise our region: Alexandria Township, Frenchtown Borough, Holland Township, Kingwood Township, and Milford Borough."Chief School Administrators/Sending Districts, Hunterdon County, New Jersey Superintendent of Schools. Accessed May 5, 2020. As of the 2018–19 school year, the high school had an enrollment of 721 students and 68.4 classroom teachers (on an FTE basis), for a student–teacher ratio of 10.5:1. Seats on the high school district's nine-member board of education are allocated based on the population of the constituent municipalities, with two seats assigned to Kingwood Township.

Eighth grade students from all of Hunterdon County are eligible to apply to attend the high school programs offered by the Hunterdon County Vocational School District, a county-wide vocational school district that offers career and technical education at its campuses in Raritan Township and at programs sited at local high schools, with no tuition charged to students for attendance.

Transportation

The two state routes that pass through are Route 12 and Route 29. The only major county road that goes through is County Route 519.

No limited access roads traverse Kingwood; the closest one is Interstate 78 in neighboring Franklin Township.

Points of interest

The Old Stone Church was built in 1837 and is now owned by the First Unitarian Universalist Fellowship of Hunterdon County. It was added to the National Register of Historic Places in 2018.

The Oak Summit Cemetery, across Oak Summit Road from the Old Stone Church, was established in 1754 and is now owned by the Prospect Hill Cemetery Association.

The Oak Summit School, a one-room schoolhouse, was established in 1849 and used until 1953. It is located next to the Old Stone Church.

The Thatcher House, built in 1765, featuring patterned brickwork, was added to the NRHP in 2020.

The Devil's Tea Table, is a prominent landmark near Warsaw Road on Route 29. It is the focal point of a series of bluffs that contain several geological features of interest, such as the type localities for van Houghton cycles, as well as the type sections for units of the Locatong and Passaic Formations of the Triassic. These bluffs are a regional scenic attraction and are admired by many tourists who float by on the adjacent Delaware River.

Notable people

People who were born in, residents of, or otherwise closely associated with Kingwood Township include:
 George Opdyke (1805–1880), Mayor of New York City
 John Runk (1791–1872), represented  in the United States House of Representatives from 1845–1847
 Kurt Wiese (1887–1974), author and children's book illustrator, including The Five Chinese Brothers and the English translation of Bambi, A Life in the Woods, the novel upon which the film Bambi'' was based

References

External links

Kingwood Township website
Hunterdon County web page for Kingwood Township

 
1746 establishments in New Jersey
Populated places established in 1746
Township form of New Jersey government
Townships in Hunterdon County, New Jersey
New Jersey populated places on the Delaware River